Persons Unknown may refer to:
 Persons Unknown (play), a 1929 play by Edgar Wallace
Persons Unknown (1958 film), Italian comedy a/k/a Big Deal on Madonna Street
"Persons Unknown", 1967 episode of British TV series Dr. Finlay's Casebook
"Persons Unknown" (song), 1980 release by English anarcho-punk band Poison Girls#Singles
Persons Unknown, 1996 American crime thriller directed by George Hickenlooper#Narrative films
Persons Unknown (TV series), 2010 American miniseries